Mindanao Avenue is an eight-to-ten lane divided avenue connecting EDSA and NLEX and is a part of Circumferential Road 5 (C-5) in Metro Manila, Philippines. It is one of the three parallel roads that connects Tandang Sora and Congressional Avenues (Visayas Avenue and Luzon Avenue were the others); that is why it was named after the southernmost mainland of the Philippines, Mindanao. It used to be a  highway connecting North Avenue and Congressional Avenue, but as a part of the C-5 projects, Mindanao Avenue was extended to EDSA in the south and to Quirino Highway to the north. The new roads opened in 2000.

Another road also named Mindanao Avenue, also in Quezon City, starts in Barangay Santa Monica, crosses Commonwealth Avenue and Regalado Highway, and terminates at a dead end at School of Saint Anthony in Barangay Greater Lagro, Quezon City. That road is not in any way connected to the original Mindanao Avenue but was planned to be the one and the same road according to the 1949 Master Plan for Quezon City. It would have connected the Diliman Quadrangle to the La Mesa Watershed area.

Mindanao Avenue replaced some segments of Tandang Sora Avenue belonging to C-5; Tandang Sora has no access to North Luzon Expressway. NLEX Segment 8.1, also known as the NLEX Mindanao Avenue Link, began construction afterwards.

In 2017, DPWH has resumed construction of the  Mindanao Avenue Extension Project, after being halted for years due to road right-of-way issues, notably involving residential areas. A total of  portion of the road was earlier completed and opened since 2014. In June 2018, DPWH has opened additional  portion from P. Dela Cruz Street to the current end at MGM Road. The road will be extended further until it meets General Luis Street in North Caloocan.

Intersections

Notes

See also
 Epifanio De los Santos Avenue
 Circumferential Road 5
 North Luzon Expressway
 Regalado Avenue
 Greater Fairview

References

Streets in Metro Manila